MQY or mqy may refer to:

 MQY, the IATA and FAA LID code for Smyrna Airport (Tennessee), Tennessee, United States
 mqy, the ISO 639-3 code for Manggarai language, Indonesia